The Kapaz PFK 2015–16 season is Kapaz's fourth Azerbaijan Premier League season, and seventh season since their reformation in 2009. It is their first season with Shahin Diniyev as manager, during which they will participate in the Azerbaijan Cup as well as the League.

Squad

Transfers

Summer

In:

Out:

Winter

In:

Out:

Competitions

Azerbaijan Premier League

Results summary

Results

League table

Azerbaijan Cup

Squad statistics

Appearances and goals

|-
|colspan="14"|Players who appeared for Kapaz but left during the season:

|}

Goal scorers

Disciplinary record

Notes
Qarabağ have played their home games at the Tofiq Bahramov Stadium since 1993 due to the ongoing situation in Quzanlı.
The match between Gabala and Kapaz on 31 October 2015, was suspended in 29th minute due to server fog. The remainder of the game was played the next day, 1 November 2015, at 20:00.

References

External links 
 Official website
 Kapaz FC's Facebook page
 Kapaz PFK  at PFL.AZ

Kapaz PFK seasons
Azerbaijani football clubs 2015–16 season